Gilgit-Baltistan Tourism Department is a government body to control tourism and travel in the Pakistani self-governing territory of Gilgit–Baltistan.  It controls travel visas and all types of tourism.

External links
 

Tourism in Pakistan